Tin Yat is one of the MTR Light Rail stops. It is located at ground level at the centre of Tin Shui Road and Tin Sau Road in Tin Shui Wai, Yuen Long District, Hong Kong. It began service on 7 December 2003 and belongs to Zone 5A.

The stop has five platforms; platform 3 is not in use. There is also a Light Rail customer service centre.

References

MTR Light Rail stops
Former Kowloon–Canton Railway stations
Tin Shui Wai
Railway stations in Hong Kong opened in 2003
MTR Light Rail stops named from housing estates
2003 establishments in Hong Kong